The Mayor-President of the Autonomous City of Melilla or simply the President of Melilla, is the highest authority of the Spanish autonomous city of Melilla, acting as head of government and as presiding officer of the Assembly of Melilla.

The current and 5th Mayor-President of Melilla is Eduardo de Castro of the Citizens, who has held the office since 15 June 2019. Prior to March 1995, when the enclave's Statute of Autonomy was passed, the city was part of Province of Málaga.

Duties and powers 
The mayor-president has the responsibility to lead the government; appoint the government members; represent the City; convene and preside over the sessions of the Plenary; design, develop and execute the powers entrusted to the autonomous cities by the Constitution; dictate regulations; execute the budget; head the civil service and hire, fire or sanction the personnel at its service; head the local police; lead the urban planning; exercise all judicial actions to defend the interests of the City; and adopt all necessary measures in case of catastrophe.

Election 
The election system follows the general guidelines of all mayoral elections. The citizens vote for the local assemblies or councils on the basis of universal suffrage, with all nationals over eighteen, registered in the corresponding municipality and in full enjoyment of all political rights entitled to vote. The mayor-president is in turn elected by the plenary Assembly of Melilla, with a legal clause providing for the candidate of the most-voted party to be automatically elected to the post in the event no other candidate is to gather an absolute majority of votes.

Cessation 
The general cases of cessation are death, incapacitation or resignation.

As in the regional or State governments, the mayor-president can be removed by a vote of no confidence approved by the majority of the local assembly. This motion necessarily needs to proposed an alternative candidate, being a constructive vote of no confidence.

The mayor-president itself can also propose a vote of confidence in order to pass a relevant legislation and if the mayor-president fails to overcome the motion, the mayor must submit his resignation. The mayor-president can't propose more than one vote of confidence per year and this kind of motions can't be proposed on the last year of legislature.

In both processes, the mayor-president can not preside over the session, so it will correspond to one of the Vice Presidents of the Assembly.

List of Mayor-Presidents of Melilla
For a list of leaders in the period prior to Melilla becoming an autonomous community (before 1995), see: List of governors of Melilla

Governments:

Timeline

References

Sources
 World Statesmen.org

External links
  

Government of Melilla
Melilla
Mayors of places in Spain